Fay Davis (December 15, 1872<ref>[https://books.google.com/books?id=VzFAAAAAYAAJ&dq=fay+davis+actress&pg=PA276  The Actors' Birthday Book: An Authoritative Insight Into the Lives of the Men and Women of the Stage Born Between January 1 and December 31], p.276 c.1907 by Johnson Briscoe</ref> –  March 1, 1945) was an American stage actress from Boston, Massachusetts who was a star of many Shakespearean plays.

Early life
Fay Davis was born December 15, 1872 in Boston, Massachusetts. She attended the Winthrop School in Boston and a school of oratory. Davis studied under the monologist Leland Powers. Davis became popular as a reciter in Boston and other places in New England. She also acted as an amateur in her hometown.

Career
Davis came to England in 1895 to join the company of Sir Charles Wyndham. She quickly achieved success as Zoe Nuggetson in A Squire of Dames. In 1896 she went to the St. James's Theatre where she remained five years. At this time she played her first roles in productions of the works of Shakespeare.

In 1902 Davis returned to America and made her debut at the Empire Theatre under Charles Frohman. For Frohman, Davis appeared as Wilhelmina in Imprudence.

In the first decade of the twentieth century she acted in a number of London plays, namely Rupert of Hentzau, A Debt of Honour, The Wisdom of the Wise, Iris, and Caesar's Wife. She returned to England in 1906, acting in the provinces and then London. In the latter she appeared in leading roles in Henry V, Romeo and Juliet, The Merchant of Venice, and Twelfth Night.

In 1910 she played in Trelawny of the Wells in London. In 1914 she appeared in a film of  Enoch Arden. During World War I Davis was in Searchlights and Daddy Long-Legs. Her final London shows were The Heart of a Child (1921), The Second Mrs. Tanqueray (1922), Secret Service (1926), Hamlet (1930), and The Shadow Princess and On The Rocks (1933). Her final professional appearance was at the Winter Garden Theatre in London in 1933, although she later made two appearances onstage in wartime fundraising galas in 1939 and 1942.

Personal life
She was married to the actor Gerald Lawrence. Their daughter, Marjorie Fay Lawrence (b.1908) was murdered in 1930. 

Death
Davis died in Exmouth, England in 1945.

References
 The New York Times'', "Fay Davis Is Dead; Noted Actress, 72", February 27, 1945, Page 19.

External links

1872 births
1945 deaths
19th-century American actresses
American stage actresses
20th-century American actresses
Actresses from Boston
American expatriate actresses in the United Kingdom
American Shakespearean actresses